"The Girl Most Likely" is a single by American country music artist Jeannie C. Riley. Released in November 1968, it was the first single from her album Yearbooks and Yesterdays. 
The song was written by the songwriting team of Margaret Lewis and Mira Smith, who also wrote the hits "The Rib", "Country Girl", and "Oh Singer" for Riley.

The song peaked at number 6 on the Billboard Hot Country Singles chart. It also reached number 1 on the RPM Country Tracks chart in Canada.

Chart performance

References

1968 singles
Jeannie C. Riley songs
Songs written by Margaret Lewis (singer-songwriter)
1968 songs
Songs written by Mira Ann Smith